Irradié is the fifth album by French rock singer Jacques Higelin, released in 1976.

Track listing

Personnel

Musicians
 Jacques Higelin - keyboards, banjo, vocals.
 Simon Boissezon - guitars, bass guitar.
 Louis Bertignac - guitar.
 Patrick Giani - drums, percussion.

Production
 Dominique Mallegni - photographs.

1976 albums
Jacques Higelin albums